Summer Girl may refer to:
Summer Girl, album by American band Smash Mouth
"Summer Girl" (Haim song), 2019
"Summer Girl" (Stereos song), 2009
"Summer Girl", song by English band Jamiroquai
"Summer Girls", song by American band LFO
"Summer Girls", song from the album Kescke Bak by Ralph McTell
"Summergirls", from the album 24/7 by Dino, 1987